Johannes Petrus "Han" Woerdman (29 November 1942 – 18 August 2020) was a Dutch physicist. He was a researcher at Philips Natuurkundig Laboratorium and later professor at Leiden University.

Life
Woerdman was born on 29 November 1942 in Laren, North Holland. In 1968 he started working at Philips Natuurkundig Laboratorium. He obtained his PhD in mathematics at the University of Amsterdam in 1971 under Andries Rinse Miedema with a thesis titled: "Some optical and electrical properties of a laser-generated free-carrier plasma in Si." In 1983 he left Philips and was appointed professor of experimental physics at Leiden University. 

At Leiden University Woerdman performed research into lasers and optics, specializing in classical optics. He was responsible for building the field of quantum optics at the University. In 2020 one of the articles he contributed to in 1992 was chosen as one of three classics of Physical Review A.

Woerdman was elected a member of the Royal Netherlands Academy of Arts and Sciences in 2002. In 2007 he was named a Fellow of the European Optical Society. In 2010 he was diagnosed with Parkinson's disease, which caused his death on 18 August 2020 at the age of 77.

References

1942 births
2020 deaths
Deaths from Parkinson's disease
Neurological disease deaths in the Netherlands
20th-century Dutch physicists
Laser researchers
Academic staff of Leiden University
Members of the Royal Netherlands Academy of Arts and Sciences
Optical physicists
People from Laren, North Holland
University of Amsterdam alumni